James Nankivelle McEwin (11 September 1898 – 13 June 1979) was a New Zealand cricketer who played first-class cricket for Canterbury from 1917 to 1928.

A leg-spinner, Jim McEwin had his best performance in January 1919, taking 5 for 108 and 5 for 87 when Canterbury defeated Wellington by seven wickets to regain the Plunket Shield. In the second innings he opened the bowling and bowled 29 overs unchanged. In senior club cricket for Sydenham in Christchurch he played 93 matches and took 454 wickets at an average of 16, taking five or more wickets in an innings 40 times.

References

External links
 
 

1898 births
1979 deaths
New Zealand cricketers
Canterbury cricketers
Cricketers from Wellington City